Giovanni "John" DePalma (April 8, 1885 – January 18, 1951) was an Italian-born American racecar driver.

A native of Biccari in Apulia, southern Italy, he was the brother of 1915 Indy winner Ralph DePalma and the uncle of 1925 Indy winner Pete DePaolo.

Indy 500 results

External links
 Profile on Historic Racing

1885 births
1951 deaths
Sportspeople from the Province of Foggia
American racing drivers
Indianapolis 500 drivers
Italian emigrants to the United States